Malinche is a Mexican TV series about the life of La Malinche, the indigenous translator who accompanied Hernán Cortés during his conquest of the Aztec capital Tenochtitlan. The series is spoken in native languages and the colors of the subtitles indicate which one: white is for Nahuatl, yellow is for Mayan, blue is for Popoluca, green is for Totonaca and pink is for Latin. The series first aired in 2018 on the Mexican cultural channel Canal Once.

Plot 
In 1519, Malinche is a slave to the Mayans in Tabasco. When the Mayans lose a battle to the newly arrived Spaniards, they give women to them as a tribute of war. Even though Malinche is not picked as one of these women, she sneaks into the group. She hopes slavery under the Spaniards is better than under the Mayans. During the expedition to Tenochtitlan, Malinche notices that the Spaniards are having a tough time communicating with the locals so she offers her services as a translator. She speaks both Nahuatl and Mayan, which completes the language skills of the other translator Jerónimo de Aguilar who speaks Spanish and Mayan. Malinche becomes very important in the negotiations with the different tribes. She tries to use this newly acquired and relative power to negotiate her freedom, so she can finally go back to her hometown.

Cast 
María Mercedes Coroy as Malinche
José María de Tavira as Hernán Cortés
Luis Arrieta as Jerónimo de Aguilar
Alberto Barahona as Pedro de Alvarado
Jesús García Ra as Motecuhzoma
Josué Maychi as Cuauhtemoc

Episodes

References

External links 
 Malinche at Canal Once 
 

Television shows filmed in Mexico
2010s Mexican drama television series
2018 Mexican television series debuts
Spanish-language television shows